Malek Salama (born 1 February 1997, Cairo, Egypt) is an Egyptian karateka. He is a member of the Egyptian Karate national team. He represented his country in several competitions including world, continental and Karate1. In 2013, he won his first World Gold Medal at the World Karate Championship  
In 2019, he represented Egypt at the 2019 African Games and he won the gold medal in the men's kumite 60 kg event.

At the 2018 Mediterranean Games in Tarragona, Catalonia, Spain, he won one of the bronze medals in the men's kumite 60 kg event.

References 

Living people
1997 births
Place of birth missing (living people)
Egyptian male karateka
Competitors at the 2018 Mediterranean Games
Mediterranean Games bronze medalists for Egypt
Mediterranean Games medalists in karate
Competitors at the 2019 African Games
African Games medalists in karate
African Games gold medalists for Egypt
21st-century Egyptian people